North Fredericktown is an unincorporated community in Washington County, Pennsylvania, United States.

It is home to the Horn Davis Overholtzer Bridge.

Unincorporated communities in Washington County, Pennsylvania
Pennsylvania populated places on the Monongahela River
Unincorporated communities in Pennsylvania